Stewart Peter Hamill (born 22 January 1960) is a Scottish former footballer who played in the Football League for Leicester City, Scunthorpe United, Northampton Town and Scarborough.

References

External links
 

Scottish footballers
English Football League players
1960 births
Living people
Pollok F.C. players
Leicester City F.C. players
Scunthorpe United F.C. players
Kettering Town F.C. players
Nuneaton Borough F.C. players
Altrincham F.C. players
Scarborough F.C. players
Association football wingers